The Veuglaire (derived from the German Vogler and Vogelfänger, and the Flemish Vogheler, after a gun manufacturer named Vögler. English: Fowler) was a wrought iron cannon, and part of the artillery of France in the Middle Ages.

The Veuglaire was up to 2 meters (8 feet) long, and weighing from 150 kg to several tonnes, and compares to the Crapaudins or Crapaudaux, which were shorter (4 to 8 feet) and lighter than the Veuglaires. The Veuglaires were usually breech-loading, and therefore used a separate "powder chamber" (boîte à poudre) in which powder and ball were located upon loading, and the main body of the cannon was formed of a tube opened at both ends.

Veuglaires, together with Crapaudins, were considered medium-sized weapons and tended to have smaller chambers than bombards. They belonged to a category of weapons developed from the late 14th century, which had smaller bore and flatter trajectory. The category includes the culverin, curtall, serpentines, falcon and arquebus.

Notes

See also
 Artillery of France in the Middle Ages

Medieval artillery
Artillery of France